The  is a Japanese railway line in Kagawa Prefecture, which connects Kawaramachi Station in Takamatsu with Kotoden-Shido Station in Sanuki. It is owned and operated by the Takamatsu-Kotohira Electric Railroad. The line color is rose pink.

Station list
All stations are located in Kagawa Prefecture.

History
The line first opened on 18 November 1911 between Imabashi and Shido Station (now ), electrified at 600 V DC. The line voltage was increased to 1,500 V DC from August 1966.

References

Rail transport in Kagawa Prefecture
Shido Line